Raluca Ionițǎ (born 9 June 1976 in Ploiești) is a Romanian sprint canoer who competed in the late 1990s and early 2000s (decade). Competing in two Summer Olympics, she won a bronze medal in the K-4 500 m event at Sydney in 2000.

External links
 

1976 births
Living people
Romanian female canoeists
Olympic canoeists of Romania
Olympic bronze medalists for Romania
Olympic medalists in canoeing
Canoeists at the 1996 Summer Olympics
Canoeists at the 2000 Summer Olympics
Medalists at the 2000 Summer Olympics
Sportspeople from Ploiești